Dric may refer to:

Dric, a village in Câmpeni Town, Alba County, Romania
Detroit River International Crossing, a new bridge between Canada and the United States of America